Matvey Alekseyevich Uzhgin (born 23 November 2000) is a Russian football player who plays for FC Chayka Peschanokopskoye.

Club career
He made his debut in the Russian Football National League for FC Yenisey Krasnoyarsk on 5 October 2019 in a game against FC Nizhny Novgorod.

References

External links
 
 
 
 Profile by Russian Football National League

2000 births
Sportspeople from Krasnoyarsk
Living people
Russian footballers
Association football defenders
FC Yenisey Krasnoyarsk players
FC Chayka Peschanokopskoye players